Divina is a village and municipality in Žilina District in the Žilina Region of northern Slovakia.

History
In historical records the village was first mentioned in 1325.

Geography
The municipality lies at an altitude between 355 – 910 metres (center of the village 550 meters) and covers an area of 21.881 km2. It has a population of about 2384 people.

Monuments and Memorials

Church of St. Andrew 
Late baroque church, built between 1773 and 1779 by John Nepomuk Szunyogh. The church is registered in the Central List of the Slovak Memorial Fund under the number 1333/1.

Statue of St. John of Nepomuk in Divina 
The Statue of St. John of Nepomuk is registered in the Central List of the Slovak Memorial Fund under the number 1334/2. It is a sandstone sculpture from 1796 standing on a stone base. The project of restoration of St. John of Nepomuk statue was initiated by architect Marek Sobola and was started in 2016, was completed in June 2017. Partners, who were addressed to cooperate have either some connection to St. John of Nepomuk or to Slovakia and was from: Germany, Cambodia, Bulgaria, Bavaria, Vatican and Czech Republic. The project was carried out under auspices of the Embassy of the Federal Republic of Germany in Slovakia. Exceptional realization of the restoration project of the statie has gained a Honorable recognition by Minister of Culture of the Slovak Republic, Ľubica Laššáková on the 13th edition of the competition Phoenix – National Cultural Monument of the Year 2017.

Monument of Divina Meteorite 
Meteorit from Divina (official name Gross-Divina) fell into the center of the village on July 24, 1837. From the mineralogical point of view it is a chondrite. The weight was 10.5 kg. The memorial was designed by architect Marek Sobola, native of Divina. Architect used a corten steel for the construction. The memorial contains a precise 3D copy of the meteorite. The original is in the Hungarian Natural History Museum as well as the Natural History Museum Vienna.

Personalities and natives 

 Štefan Závodník (*2. 9. 1813, Horná Poruba – † 12. 2. 1885, Pružina) was a Roman Catholic priest, pedagogue, important personality of Slovak national past and pioneer of bee-keeping in Slovakia. He was also the organizer of the first Upper Hungarian societies. In the years 1836 – 1841 he worked as a chaplain in Divina and between 1841 – 1850 he was a Roman Catholic priest in Divina.
 Marek Sobola (*3. 7. 1981, Žilina) is a Slovak authorised garden and landscape architect, professional gardener, designer and heraldic artist. He is a member of the Slovak Chamber of Architects and Czech Chamber of Architects. His specialization is an Ecclesiastical heraldry in Missionary countries.

Genealogical resources

The records for genealogical research are available at the state archive "Štátny archív v Žiline so sídlom v Bytči".

 Roman Catholic church records (births/marriages/deaths): 1771-1898 (parish A).

See also
 List of municipalities and towns in Slovakia

References

External links
https://web.archive.org/web/20071116010355/http://www.statistics.sk/mosmis/eng/run.html
Surnames of living people in Divina

Villages and municipalities in Žilina District